Night in Paradise may refer to:

 A Night in Paradise (1919 film), a 1919 German film
 A Night in Paradise (1932 film), a 1932 German film
 Night in Paradise (1946 film), a 1946 American film
 Night in Paradise (2020 film), a 2020 South Korean film